Mike Gomes (born 19 September 1988) is a Swiss football defender who plays for Neuchâtel Xamax II.

Personal life
Gomes was born in Switzerland and is of Portuguese descent.

References

External links

1988 births
People from Neuchâtel
Sportspeople from the canton of Neuchâtel
Swiss people of Portuguese descent
Living people
Swiss men's footballers
Association football defenders
Neuchâtel Xamax FCS players
Yverdon-Sport FC players
Servette FC players
Swiss Super League players
Swiss Challenge League players
2. Liga Interregional players
Swiss 1. Liga (football) players
Swiss Promotion League players